Liu Liming (born 29 December 1986) is a Chinese cross-country skier. She competed in the women's sprint at the 2006 Winter Olympics.

References

External links
 

1986 births
Living people
Chinese female cross-country skiers
Olympic cross-country skiers of China
Cross-country skiers at the 2006 Winter Olympics
Place of birth missing (living people)